The Worms Synagogue, also known as Rashi Shul, is an 11th-century synagogue located in Worms, Germany. Situated in the northern part of the city center, the synagogue is one of the oldest in Germany. Because of its historical importance and its testimony to the European Jewish cultural tradition through millennia, the Worms Synagogue was inscribed on the UNESCO World Heritage List in 2021 (along with other medieval Jewish cultural sites in Speyer and Mainz).

History
The first synagogue at the site was built in 1034 and is therefore regarded as the oldest existing synagogue in Germany. The building was destroyed during the First Crusade in 1096 and subsequently rebuilt in 1175 in the Romanesque style. In 1186 a subterranean mikveh was constructed southwest of the synagogue.

During the pogroms of 1349 and 1615 the synagogue was badly damaged: in both pogroms the vaulted ceilings and the walls were heavily damaged. During reconstruction after 1355 Gothic forms for the window and the vault were chosen. Of comparable seriousness was the damage after the fire of 1689 during the Nine Years' War. When the building was restored in 1700, the interior was renovated in period style.

On Kristallnacht in 1938 the synagogue was once again attacked and reduced to rubble. It was painstakingly reconstructed in 1961, using as many of the original stones as could be salvaged. The synagogue, open as a museum, continues to be a functioning synagogue used by the Jewish community.

In May 2010, the synagogue was firebombed by arsonists, suspected to be anti-Zionists. The firebombs were thrown against eight corners of the stone building and against a window, but no one was injured and no serious damage to the building was reported.

Architecture
Built at the point when late Romanesque style was fading and Gothic rising, the rectangular prayer hall features a pair of Romanesque columns supporting groin vaults. The windows in the thick stone walls are simple gothic arches. The windows in the adjoining study hall, the so-called Rashi Shul, have rounded Romanesque arches. The women’s section of the prayer hall has Romanesque windows in the eastern wall, and gothic windows in the western wall.

References

External links

Worms tourism site on the synagogue

Buildings and structures in Worms, Germany
Gothic architecture in Germany
Romanesque and Gothic synagogues
Synagogues in Germany
11th-century synagogues
Religious buildings and structures in Rhineland-Palatinate
Rebuilt synagogues
World Heritage Sites in Germany
Religious buildings and structures completed in 1034
1030s establishments in the Holy Roman Empire